Takkar is a village and union council of Mardan District in Khyber Pakhtunkhwa province of Pakistan.

See also
Takkar massacre

References

Union councils of Mardan District
Populated places in Mardan District